José Dorángel Vargas Gómez (born May 14, 1957), also known as "El comegente" (lit. people eater), is a serial killer and cannibal in Venezuela. He was a homeless man who used to hunt passersbys at a park in the city of San Cristobal, Táchira. Once he was caught, he confessed to killing and eating at least eleven men over a period of two years preceding his arrest in 1999.

Biography 

Dorángel Vargas was born in 1957 to poor farmers. His priors included three arrests, two of them for minor offenses (theft of chickens and cattle). The third was acquired in 1995 when he was admitted to the Institute of Psychiatric Rehabilitation Peribeca for the murder of Baltazar Cruz Moreno, and the subsequent cannibalism of his body. He managed to escape from that center, and lead a seemingly normal life in poverty.

It is believed that he was actively murdering men between November 1998 and January 1999. Vargas hunted victims with a tube-shaped spear and occasionally with rocks. He kept the parts that he could cook and usually buried the feet, hands and heads. It seemed that his primary targets were unsuspecting athletes and laborers working on the riverbank. He did not eat women or children, and when asked why, he explained that he felt that they were too "pure" to consume. Since he had no place to store the human flesh, most of it would decompose quickly, which made him kill routinely.

On February 12, 1999, members of the civil defense found the remains of two young people and alerted the security forces. Searching around the same area, the remains of six more bodies were found. Hypotheses about the findings included the plot being a cemetery for corpses linked to drug gangs and even a burial ground for victims of Satanic cult rituals. The victims, after further investigation, were all found to have been missing persons. As the investigation progressed, Vargas became a suspect. An inspection of the shack that he was living in near the area revealed several vessels containing human flesh and viscera prepared for consumption, along with three human heads and several feet and hands.

In 2016, Vargas was involved in a prison riot in which he killed two other inmates and served their remains to other inmates.

See also 
 List of serial killers by country
 List of serial killers by number of victims

References 

1956 births
1997 murders in Venezuela
1998 murders in Venezuela
1990s murders in Venezuela   
2016 murders in Venezuela
Homeless people
Living people
Male serial killers
People convicted of murder by Venezuela
People with schizophrenia
Venezuelan cannibals
Venezuelan people convicted of murder
Venezuelan serial killers